Nikolai Vasilyevich Marayev (born 16 April 1995) is a Russian football player who plays for FC Dynamo Bryansk.

Club career
He made his debut in the Russian Football National League for FC Dynamo Bryansk on 1 August 2020 in a game against FC Orenburg, as a starter.

References

External links
 
 Profile by Russian Football National League
 

1995 births
People from Zaraysky District
Sportspeople from Moscow Oblast
Living people
Russian footballers
Association football midfielders
FC Spartak Kostroma players
FC Znamya Truda Orekhovo-Zuyevo players
FC Dynamo Bryansk players
FC Olimp-Dolgoprudny players